Kiss Me Again may refer to:

Films
Kiss Me Again (1925 film), directed by Ernst Lubitsch
Kiss Me Again (1931 film), starring Bernice Claire, Edward Everett Horton and Walter Pidgeon
Kiss Me Again (2006 film), starring Jeremy London
Kiss Me Again (2010 film), directed and written by Gabriele Muccino

TV
 Kiss Me Again (TV series) 2018 Thai TV series

Songs
"Kiss Me Again", a song from the operetta Mlle. Modiste by Victor Herbert
"Kiss Me Again", a song by We Are the In Crowd
"Kiss Me Again", a song by Dinosaur, a moniker for Arthur Russell